Wickramasinghe Wijesundara Ekanayake Abeykoon Mudiyanse Ralahamilage Sir James Williams Maduwanwela (known as Maduwanwela Maha Disawe ) (1844–1930) was a Ceylonese colonial-era headmen. He was appointed to the post of Dissawa by the British Government of Ceylon.

Government service
He was educated at S. Thomas' College, Mutwal. He entered public service under the British administration as a Clerk and was promoted as Korale Mahaththaya there after Rate Mahatmaya and finally appointed as Dissava.

Wealth
Maduwanwala claimed to have inherited an 83,000 acre "nindagama" or land grant in the Kolonne area from his father, which he claimed to have been gifted to the family by King Wimaladharmasooriya II. He built a large fortune from this land through timber trading, gem mining and elephant kraals, most notably the Elephant Kraal in Panamure which had been started by the Maduwanwela Maha Disawe in the late 1800s while he was a Rate Mahatmaya along with J.T. Ellawela. Through these proceeds Maduwanwela Disawe expanded his family seat Maduwanwela Walawwa.

Family
Maduwanwela Disawe married twice. His first wife Ekneligoda Kumarihami died given birth to their only child a daughter named Dingiri Appey who was a cripple. He married again Kalawana Kumarihami, a close relative, they had now children and she predeceased him. Before his death, he placed his wealth in trust for his daughter, placing nephew  Francis Molamure and the Kalawana Kumarihami's nephew, Cyril Dangamuwa as trustees. He died on 6 September 1930 from heart disease.

See also
List of political families in Sri Lanka

External links & References

The Meedeniya Ancestry

Sri Lankan Buddhists
Dissava
Sinhalese people
Alumni of S. Thomas' College, Mount Lavinia
People from British Ceylon